Mir Shams-ud-Din Muhammad Arāqi (CE), also known as Mir Syed Muhammad Musavi Isfahani, was an Iranian Sufi Muslim saint. Araqi was part of the order of Twelver Shia Sufis in Jammu and Kashmir who greatly influenced the social fabric of the Kashmir Valley and its surrounding regions.

Early life 
Araqi was born in Kundala, a village near Suliqan to Darvish Ibrahim and Firuza Khatun. Darvish was a Sufi dedicated to Muhammad Nurbakhsh Qahistani while Firuza was descended from a Sayyid family from Qazvin. As an adolescent, Araqi first encountered Nurbakhsh when the latter arrived in Suliqan but was told by Nurbakhsh himself not to engage in Sufi devotions due to family responsibilities. Soon after Nurbaksh's death around 1464, Araqi visited his grave and chose to follow the Noorbakshia path.

Career in Herat 
Soon after deciding to join the Noorbakshia order, Araqi spent nineteen years traveling and studying under various khanqah masters throughout Iran and Iraq. He eventually rose in the order's hierarchy and became settled in Durusht near Tehran under master Qasim Fayzbakhsh.

When Timurid Sultan Husayn Bayqara invited Qasim to join his court at Herat, Araqi accompanied him. In Herat, Araqi apparently undertook a mission for Bayqara to investigate if a king from Iraq was planning to conquer parts of Khurasan under Timurid control. Once back in Herat after determining that the plans were untrue, Araqi and Qasim were given rewards and elevated positions within the court.

Soon after the earlier mission, Araqi was sent as an envoy of Bayqara to Kashmir under the pretext of a diplomatic visit to the Kashmir royal court and gathering medicinal herbs for Qasim. However, the embassy is not mentioned in Timurid histories and Qasim seems to have been the main supporter of the mission, likely meaning that the main purpose of the assignment was to expand the Noorbakshia order into Kashmir.

Career in Kashmir 
From Herat, Araqi traveled to Multan and eventually arrived in Kashmir at around 1483. He was greeted by Sultan Hasan Shah. Initially taking the role of an ambassador, he eventually became an independent religious missionary.

He is considered by some to be the effective founder of Shia Islam in Ladakh and Gilgit–Baltistan, as well as in the rest of Jammu and Kashmir and its adjoining areas. After arriving in Srinagar, he established his Khanqah in the suburbs (now known as Zaddibal), which would later go on to produce many of Kashmir's future military leaders. He was best known for influencing the nobles of the Chak clan to embrace the Noorbakshia Sufi Islamic faith as well as Shia Islam as a whole. Araqi translated the Fiqh-i-Ahwat (book of jurisprudence), which was written in Arabic by his teacher, Syed Muhammad Noorbaksh.

Death 
Araqi died in 1515 and was buried at Zaddibal in Srinagar, Jammu and Kashmir. His body was later shifted to Chadoora for unknown reasons, where he is currently buried at a Sufi Islamic shrine.
Araqi was a descendant of Musa al-Kadhim, the seventh Imam in Twelver Shia Islam.

See also
 Tomb of Shams-ud-Din Araqi
 Persecution of Kashmiri Shias
 Tafazzul Husain Kashmiri
 Shia Islam in the Indian subcontinent

Notes

Sources 
 Bashir, Shahzad (2003). Messianic Hopes and Mystical Visions: The Nūrbakhshīya Between Medieval and Modern Islam. University of South Carolina Press.

References

External links 

 

Iranian Sufi saints
1484 births
1526 deaths
History of Kashmir
Kashmiri Sufi saints